Many buildings in Egypt can be put under the classification of castles, citadels, forts, and fortifications.

List by age

Pharaonic

Lower Egypt
 Fortification of Memphis
 Fort of Walls of the Prince (inebw heka), Eastern Delta.
 Fortress of Wadi Natrun, western Delta.
 Rhakotis fort, Alexandria
 Tahpanhes fort or Castle of the Jew's Daughter
 Heliopolis Fortifications.

Middle Egypt
 Pi-Sekhemkheperre, near Herakleopolis Magna

Upper Egypt
 Kom el-Ahmar (Hierakonpolis) fortifications
 Fortress of Abydos
 Shunet ez Zebib forts near Abydos
 Medinet Habu New Kingdom fortification
 El-Kab fortifications
 Thebes fortifications.

Sinai
 The Way of Horus coastal forts, Sinai
 Tharu castle, Sinai
 Qantara East fort, Sinai
 Kolsum castle, Suez
 Boto Fort of Seti I, (Qatia area), Sinai.
 Tell-Huba Fortress, Sinai
 Pelusium Fort,
 Tharu city fortifications.

Western Desert
 Siwa Oasis fortification, Western desert of Egypt

 QasrAllam fort

Nubia

 The ancient castle at Buhen
 Fort of Kubban, Nubia
 Semna fortification
 Kumma fort
 Aniba Fort
 Uronarti fort
 Mirgissa fort
 Shalfak fort
 Askut fort
 Senusret I-III seventeen south fortresses.
 Dabenarti fort
 Faras Fort
 Serra Fort.

Persian
 Persian fort of Rhakortis, North coast

Greco-Roman

Cairo
 Fort Babylon, Cairo

Delta
 Naucratis Greek fort

Kharga Oasis
 Ain Umm Dabadib fort, Kharga Oasis.
 El Deir fort, Kharga Oasis.
 Qasr el Labeka fort, Kharga Oasis.
 Qasr Sumaria fort, Kharga Oasis.
 Qasr el Geb fort, Kharga Oasis.
 Al-Haiz fort, Bahariya Oasis.
 Nadura fort, Kharga Oasis
 Qasr el-Ghueita fort, Kharga Oasis
 Qasr el-Zayyan fort, Kharga Oasis

Red Sea
 Castellum of Badia, Gebel Abu Dukhan, near Hurghada, Red Sea
 Abu Sha'ar Fort, Red Sea.

Fayoum
 Temple of Stones fort, Fayoum.
 Der el Memun, fort where Anthony the Great lived, across from Faiyum.

Lower Egypt
 Al-Heita fort, Eastern desert, Qena.

Sinai
 Saint Catherine's Monastery fortification, Mount Sinai in the Sinai Peninsula (by Justinian I 548–565)

North coast
 Alexandria fortifications 
 Taposiris Magna Fortress, Alexandria

Islamic

Cairo 
 Cairo Citadel, Mukkattam, Cairo
 Ayyubid Cairo City Fortification
Gates of Cairo
 Al Fustat city walls

Alexandria

 Citadel of Qaitbay, Alexandria
 Fortification of Bab Rosetta, Alexandria
 Qaitbey Citadel, Rosetta (known as Fort Julien)

Red Sea & Eastern desert
 Quseir Castle

Sinai
 Salah El-Din castle, Pharaoh's Island, Sinai 
 Nweiba' Castle 
 Qalaat Al-Gindi, Ras Sedr, Sinai
 Al-Arish citadel 
 Nakhl citadel
 Farma citadel 
 El Tina castle, North Sinai

Western desert
 Siwa oasis fort
 Shali fortified village, Siwa Oasis.

Modern Egypt

Cairo

Alexandria & North coast
 Fort Julien, Rosetta Fort.
 Agami Fort, Alexandria (by French occupation) 
 Abu Qir Castle (was used by Mohammed Ali as a prison)

Western Desert
 Mersa Matruh Fortifications (1941 AD)
 Sidi Barrani Fortifications (1941 AD) 
 Alam el Halfa Fortifications (1941 AD)
 Sollum fortified base camp (1941 AD) 
  Halfaya Pass Fortification (1941 AD)
 Bir-Hakeim fort (1942 AD)

Sinai
 Al-Arish castle
 Sharm El-Sheikh fortification by Egypt (1954 AD) 
 Castle Zaman, Sinai

Suez canal
 Adgerud castle, Suez.
 Kolsum castle, Suez.
 Bar Lev Line
 Fort Lahtzanit
 Fort Budapest

Red Sea & Eastern Desert
 Green Island (Egypt) Fortification, Red Sea (1969 AD)
 Shadwan island fortifications, Red Sea (1960s AD)

List by areas & time

Western Desert
 Zawiyet Umm el-Rakham, a Ramesside fort near the Libyan coast where trade goods were found. For example, cakes of Egyptian blue pigment, brought there for export, were found, along with indications of exotic imports such as olive oil and wine.

Alexandria 
 Qaitbey Castle.
Fort Pharos
Fort Silsileh
Fort Adda
Fort Ras-el-Tin
Fort Marabout
Fort Adjemi
Marza-el-Kana
Citadel of Mex
Fort Kamaria
Fort Om Qabeba
Fort Saleh Aga

Rosetta 
 Fort Julien

Port Said
 El Gamil

Damietta 

 Ezzbet El-Borg Defensive tower.
 Urabi Fort.
 Old Damietta city wall & Fortifications.

Sinai castles, forts, fortifications and citadels 
 13th century BC The Way of Horus coastal & Sinai forts.
 13th century BC Tharu castle.
 13th century BC Boto Fort (by Seti I), (Qatia area), Sinai.
 13th century BC Tel Habwa Fort (by Seti I), (Qantara area), Sinai
 13th century BC Tel Kadwa Fort, Sinai
 13th century BC Tel Al Hebr Fort, Sinai
 13th century BC Kharouba Fort, Sinai
 13th century BC Baer Al-Abd Fort, Sinai
 Unknown time Pharonic El Tina castle, Beer Al Abd, North Sinai
 Circa 100 BC Ptolemaic Fort of Tal Abou Sayfi, South of Qantara Sharq city.
 200 AD Roman Fort of Tal Abou Sayfi, South of Qantara Sharq city (by Emperor Maximinus Thrax).
 Unknown time Roman Lahfen castle near Al-Arish.
 Saint Catherine's Monastery  fortification, Mount Sinai, Sinai Peninsula.
 640 AD Farma (Pelusium) citadel.
 7th century AD Justinian's Strasini Fort, Tel Felosiyia, near Pelusium.
 7th century AD Garha Roman fort, on Bardawil lake, North Sinai.
 Unknown time Byzantine fort, qaseema, Hosna, Middle Sinai.
 Unknown time Al-Mohammadyia Arabic Fort, Beer Al Abd, North Sinai.
 1115 AD Al-Soubak Fort (by Baldwin), Wadi Araba.
 1116 Ad Aiyla fort (by Baldwin), Aiyla city, Aqaba bay.
 1116 AD Pharaoh Island Fort (by Baldwin), Aqaba bay.
 1117 AD Wadi Musa fort (by Baldwin).
 1181 AD Aiyla Island Castle (by Ayyobids).
 1182 AD Salah El-Din castle  Sedr, Sinai.
 1184 AD Qalaat Al-Gindi (by Saladin), Ras Sedr, Sinai.
 1184 AD Salah El-Din castle, Taba (Pharaoh Island), Sinai.
 1516 AD Al-Arish citadel (by Al-Ashraf Qansuh al-Ghawri).
 1516 AD Al-Baghla fort (by Al-Ashraf Qansuh al-Ghawri).
 1516 AD Naqab Al-Aqaba Fort(by Al-Ashraf Qansuh al-Ghawri).
 1516 AD An-Nakhl Fortress (by Al-Ashraf Qansuh al-Ghawri).
 1799 AD Qatiyah Fort, West of sinai (by General Lograng of Napoleon Army).
 1799 Siege of El Arish Castle
 1893 Nuweiba Castle.
 1910s Turkish Fortifications at Hosna, middle Sinai.
 1910s Turkish Fortifications at Al-Arish Castle, North Sinai.
 1910s Turkish Fortifications at Nekhel, Sinai.
 1910s Turkish Fortifications at Salah El Din Castle, South Sinai.
 1960s & 1970s Egyptian Defensive fortifications built by Egyptian Armed forces during the Attrition war on the Western bank of Suez canal & Bar Lev Line of fortifications on Eastern side of Suez Canal (by Israel occupation forces).
 1990s Touristic Castle Zaman, Sinai 
 Unknown time Ain al Qudairat Fort, Hosna, North Sinai.

See also

 Qasr (disambiguation)
 List of buildings
 List of fortifications
 List of castles
 List of forts
 List of walls
 List of cities with defensive walls
 List of established military terms (Engineering)

References

External links 
 Fortifications, Police Beats, and Military Checkpoints in Ancient Egypt

 
Egy
Cast*les
Castles
Egypt
Egypt